Armando Círio, O.S.I.  (April 30, 1916 – August 11, 2014) was a Brazilian bishop of the Roman Catholic Church. At his death he was one of oldest bishops in the Catholic Church and the oldest Brazilian bishop.

Círio born in Calamandrana, Italy, in April 1916 and was ordained a priest on June 29, 1940, in the religious order of Oblates of St. Joseph. He was appointed bishop of the Diocese of Toledo (Brazil) on May 14, 1960, and ordained bishop August 28, 1960. On October 15, 1979, Cirio was appointed Archbishop of the Archdiocese of Cascavel and remained there until his retirement on December 27, 1995.

External links
Catholic Hierarchy
Toledo (Brazil) diocese
Morre dom Armando Cirio, aos 98 anos

1916 births
2014 deaths
20th-century Italian Roman Catholic priests
20th-century Roman Catholic bishops in Brazil
Participants in the Second Vatican Council
People from the Province of Asti
Roman Catholic archbishops of Cascavel
Roman Catholic bishops of Cascavel
Roman Catholic bishops of Toledo, Brazil